Lupinus perennis (also wild perennial lupine, wild lupine, sundial lupine, blue lupine, Indian beet, or old maid's bonnets) is a flowering plant in the family Fabaceae.

Description
The leaves are palmately compound with 7–11 leaflets arranged radially. Their stalks are numerous, erect, striated, and slightly pubescent. The leaflets are obovate, with a blunted apex or pointed spear, and sparsely pubescent. Petioles are longer than leaflets; stipules are very small.

The inflorescence is long, sparsely flowered, sometimes almost verticillate. Flowers color can be white, blue, purple, or pink, but are most often blue or bluish purple. The calyx is silky, without bractlets; its upper labium with a protuberant basis, is integral or weakly emarginate, the lower one is integral, almost twice longer than upper. Floral bracts are styliform, shorter than the calyx, early falling. The corolla is three times longer than the calyx. The vexillum is shorter than the wings. The carina is weakly ciliate. Pods are yellow-grayish-brown, with straight lines, necklace-shaped, short and closely hirsute, easy shattered, with 5–6 seeds. Seed is oval with a light hilum.

Lupinus perennis is commonly mistaken for the Western species Lupinus polyphyllus (large-leaved lupine), which is commonly planted along roadsides. L. polyphyllus is not native to eastern North America, but has naturalized in areas in the upper Midwest and New England.

Distribution and habitat 
It is widespread in the eastern part of the USA (from Texas and Florida to Maine) and Minnesota, Canada (southern Ontario, Newfoundland and Labrador), and on the coasts of the Arctic Ocean, where it grows in sandy areas such as dunes and savannas.

Ecology

Lupinus perennis is used as foodplants by the caterpillars of several Lepidoptera. Among these are the clouded sulphur, eastern tailed blue, gray hairstreak, silvery blue, wild indigo duskywing, frosted elfin (Callophrys irus), the eastern Persius duskywing (Erynnis persius persius), and the rare and endangered Karner blue (Plebejus samuelis), whose caterpillars feed only on the lupine leaves. Leaves that have been fed on by Karner blues have distinctive transparent areas where the larvae have selectively eaten only the green, fleshy parts.

Conservation
The lupine has been declining in number and range since the Industrial Revolution. It is estimated that it has declined in number by about 90% since 1900. This decline has in turn been deemed one of the primary causes of the decline of the Karner blue butterfly. The main threats to Lupinus perennis are thought to be habitat loss, habitat fragmentation, and poor management. Currently it is considered "rare" in Pennsylvania, a species of special concern in Rhode Island, threatened in Iowa, Maryland, and New Hampshire; it is endangered in Vermont, and is extirpated from Maine.

Human development has eliminated a large portion of its viable habitat. Remaining habitat is often fragmented, which is problematic for the lupine because it limits the range over which it can reproduce. Viable lupine habitat is often difficult to maintain because it flourishes after fires and other forms of disturbance. One reason this occurs is that lupine seed coats are so tough that only pressure changes due to rapid heating or abrasion are strong enough to allow water to penetrate and start germination. Moreover, fires, feeding by large ungulates, and mowing can improve habitat quality for established lupines by changing soil quality, vegetative structure, and leaf litter depth.

References

perennis
Flora of North America
Plants described in 1753
Taxa named by Carl Linnaeus